Martha's Vineyard is an island within the U.S. state of Massachusetts.

Martha's Vineyard may also refer to:

Transport 
Martha's Vineyard (steamboat), 19th century steamer ferry that served the island of Martha's Vineyard
Martha's Vineyard Airport, public airport on the island of Martha's Vineyard
Martha's Vineyard Railroad, former railroad on the island of Martha's Vineyard

Media 
The Martha's Vineyard Times, weekly newspaper published on the island of Martha's Vineyard
Martha's Vineyard Magazine, regional magazine covering Martha's Vineyard island
Martha's Vineyard International Film Festival, film festival on the island of Martha's Vineyard

Viticulture 
Martha's Vineyard AVA, viticultural area on the islands of Martha's Vineyard and Chappaquiddick Island
A vineyard in Oakville, California growing grapes used by Heitz Wine Cellars

Other uses 
Martha's Vineyard (band), Australian rock band
Martha's Vineyard Campground, a National Historic Landmark District on the island of Martha's Vineyard
Martha's Vineyard Hospital, a not-for-profit regional medical center in Oak Bluffs, Massachusetts
Martha's Vineyard Regional High School, on the island of Martha's Vineyard
Martha's Vineyard Sharks, collegiate summer baseball team based on Martha's Vineyard
Martha's Vineyard Sign Language, a sign language once widely used on the island of Martha's Vineyard